Francisco Peña (August 22, 1971 – March 9, 2000) was an American professional boxer in the welterweight division. He was from Aurora, Colorado and was born into a Mexican American family.

Amateur career
In 1989 Peña won the U.S. National Amateur Featherweight Championship, just a year later Oscar De La Hoya would win the title.

He also fought at the 1989 World Amateur Boxing Championships that were held in Moscow.

Pro career
Pena had a record of 15 wins, 3 losses and 8 wins by knockout as a professional boxer. Among his victories, there was a 4 round split decision win over the before hand undefeated Norberto Bravo.

References

External links

American boxers of Mexican descent
Lightweight boxers
1971 births
2000 deaths
American male boxers
Boxers from Colorado